Concerning Mr. Martin is a 1937 British thriller film directed by Roy Kellino and starring Wilson Barrett, William Devlin and Marjorie Peacock. When an innocent girl is cheated by a seedy nightclub owner, a classy thief comes to her rescue.

Cast
Leo Martin - 	Wilson Barrett
Gartell - 	William Devlin
Foo - 	Lionel Montgomery
Gloria - 	Marjorie Peacock
Robin - 	Derek Williams
Mary - 	Madge Somers
Detective - 	Herbert Cameron
Commissionaire - 	Billy Wells
Elderly Man - 	Peter Popp
André	- Sterlini
Croupier - 	Paul Sheridan

Critical reception
TV Guide rated the film two out of four stars, and noted, "Tense moments between good thief Barrett and the crooked nightclub owner, Devlin, result in some exciting scenes. This clever thriller was Kellino's first film as a director."

References

External links

1937 films
British thriller films
1930s crime thriller films
British crime thriller films
Films directed by Roy Kellino
British black-and-white films
1937 directorial debut films
1930s British films